Jeremy Halvard Prynne (born 24 June 1936) is a British poet closely associated with the British Poetry Revival.

Prynne grew up in Kent and was educated at St Dunstan's College, Catford, and Jesus College, Cambridge. He is a Life Fellow of Gonville and Caius College, Cambridge. He retired in October 2005 from his posts teaching English Literature as a Lecturer and University Reader in English Poetry for the University of Cambridge and as Director of Studies in English for Gonville and Caius College; in September 2006 he retired from his position as Librarian of the College.

Prynne's early influences include Donald Davie and Charles Olson. He was one of the key figures in the Cambridge group among the British Poetry Revival poets and a major contributor to The English Intelligencer. His first book, Force of Circumstance and Other Poems, was published in 1962, but Prynne has excluded it from his canon. His Poems (1982) collected all the work he wanted to keep in print, beginning with Kitchen Poems (1968), with expanded and updated editions appearing in 1999, 2005, and 2015. 2020 to 2022 has seen an unprecedented burst of productivity, with the publication of over two dozen small press chapbooks and several substantial collections, including book-length poems, sequences and a poetic novel.
  
In addition to his poetry, Prynne has published some critical and academic prose. A transcription of a 1971 lecture on Olson's Maximus Poems at Simon Fraser University has had wide circulation. His longer works include a monograph on Ferdinand de Saussure, Stars, Tigers and the Shape of Words, and self-published, very erudite book-length commentaries on individual poems by Shakespeare (Sonnets 94 and 15), George Herbert ("Love III") and Wordsworth ("The Solitary Reaper"). His long and passionate interest in China (he was a close friend and colleague of Joseph Needham) is reflected in an essay on New Songs from a Jade Terrace, an anthology of early Chinese love poetry, which was included in the second edition of the book from Penguin (1982). His collected poetry includes a poem composed in classical Chinese under the name Pu Ling-en (蒲龄恩), reproduced in his own calligraphy. In 2016, a lengthy interview with Prynne about his poetic practice appeared in The Paris Review as part of its "The Art of Poetry" series.

Bibliography

Poetry

Force of Circumstance and Other Poems (Routledge and Kegan Paul, 1962)
Kitchen Poems (Cape Golliard, 1968)
Aristeas (Ferry Press, 1968)
Day Light Songs (Pampisford, 1968)
The White Stones (Grosseteste Press, 1969; Rpt. New York Review of Books, 2016)
Fire Lizard ( Blacksuede Boot Press, 1970)
Brass (Ferry Press, 1971)
A Night Square (Albion Village Press, 1971)
Into The Day (privately printed, distributed through Ferry Press, 1972)
Wound Response (Street Editions, 1974)
High Pink on Chrome (privately printed, distributed through Ferry Press, 1975)
News of Warring Clans (Trigram Press, 1977)
Down Where Changed (Ferry Press, 1979)
Poems (Agneau 2, 1982)
The Oval Window (privately printed, distributed through DS -The Book Shop, 1983)
Bands Around the Throat (privately printed, distributed through Ferry Press, 1987)
Word Order ( Prest Roots Press, 1989)
Jie ban mi Shi Hu (Poetical Histories, 1992)
Not-You (Equipage, 1993)
Her Weasels Wild Returning (Equipage,  1994)
For the Monogram (Equipage, 1997)
Red D Gypsum (Barque Press, 1998)
Pearls That Were (privately printed, distributed through Equipage, 1999)
Poems (Fremantle Arts Centre Press/Bloodaxe, 1999)
Triodes (Barque, 2000)
Unanswering Rational Shore (Object Permanence, 2001)
Acrylic Tips (Barque, 2002)
Biting the Air (Equipage, 2003)
Blue Slides At Rest (2004, only available in expanded Poems, 2005)
Poems (Fremantle Arts Centre Press/Bloodaxe, 2005)
To Pollen (Barque, 2006)
STREAK〜〜〜WILLING〜〜〜ENTOURAGE / ARTESIAN (Barque, 2009)
Sub Songs (Barque, 2010)
Kazoo Dreamboats; or, On What There Is (Critical Documents, 2011)
Al-Dente (Face Press, 2014)
Poems (Bloodaxe, 2015)
Each to Each (Equipage, 2017)
OF · THE · ABYSS (Materials, 2017)
Or Scissel (Shearsman, 2018)
The Oval Window: annotated edition (Bloodaxe, 2018)
Of Better Scrap (Face Press, 2019; 2nd edition corrected & expanded, 2019)
None Yet More Willing Told (Face Press, 2019)
Parkland (Critical Documents, 2019)
Bitter Honey (Legitimate Snack, 2020)
Squeezed White Noise (Face Press, 2020)
Enchanter's Nightshade (Face Press, 2020)
Memory Working: Impromptus (Face Press, 2020)
Her Air Fallen (Critical Documents, 2020)
The Fever's End (Critical Documents, 2020)
Passing Grass Parnassus (Face Press, 2020)
Memory Working: Impromptus (XI-XVII) (Face Press, 2020)
Aquatic Hocquets (Face Press, 2020)
Kernels in Vernal Silence (Face Press, 2020)
Torrid Auspicious Quartz (Face Press, 2020)
See By So (Face Press, 2020)
Duets Infer Duty (Face Press, 2020)
Orchard (Equipage, 2020)
Presume Catkins (Broken Sleep, 2021)
Otherhood Imminent Profusion (Critical Documents, 2021)
Athwart Apron Snaps (Slub Press, 2021)
Efflux Reference (Face Press, 2021)
Dune Quail Eggs (Face Press, 2021)
Lay Them Straight (Face Press, 2021)
Snooty Tipoffs (Face Press, 2021)
Memory Working: Impromptus (XVIII-XXVI) (Face Press, 2021)
At Raucous Purpose Ful (Broken Sleep, 2022)
Sea Shells Told (Face Press, 2022)
Shade Furnace (Critical Documents, 2022)
LATENCY OF THE CONDITIONAL (Face Press, 2022) 
Not Ice Novice (Face Press, 2022)

Prose

"China Figures," Modern Asian Studies 17 (1983), 671-704; Rpt. rev. as a "Postscript" to New Songs from a Jade Terrace: An Anthology of Early Chinese Love Poetry, trans. Anne Birrell, Penguin Classics, 1986. 
"English Poetry and Emphatical Language," Proceedings of the British Academy, 74 (1988), 135-69.
Stars, Tigers and the Shape of Words (Birkbeck College, 1993). 
"A Discourse on Willem de Kooning's Rosy-Fingered Dawn at Louse Point," Act 2 (1996), 34-73.
They That Haue Powre to Hurt; A Specimen of a Commentary on Shake-speares Sonnets, 94 (privately printed, 2001). 
Field Notes: 'The Solitary Reaper' and Others (privately printed, 2007).
George Herbert, 'Love [III]': A Discursive Commentary (privately printed, 2011).
Certain Prose of the English Intelligencer, eds. Neil Pattison, Reitha Pattison & Luke Roberts (Cambridge: Mountain, 2012). Includes early correspondence and essays by Prynne and others.
Concepts and Conception in Poetry (Cambridge: Critical Documents, 2014).
Graft and Corruption: Shakespeare's Sonnet 15 (Cambridge: Face Press, 2015; 2nd edition 2016).
"J.H. Prynne, The Art of Poetry No. 101," interview with Jeff Doven & Joshua Kotin, Paris Review 218 (Fall 2016).
Apophthegms (Cambridge: Face Press, 2017).
Whitman and Truth (Swindon: Shearsman Books, 2022).

Correspondence
The Collected Letters of Charles Olson and J.H. Prynne, ed. Ryan Dobran (Albuquerque, NM: University of New Mexico Press, 2017).
The Letters of Douglas Oliver and J. H. Prynne 1967-2000, ed. Joe Luna (The Last Books, 2022).

References

External links

Works
"Review of Charles Olson, Maximus Poems IV, V, VI." The Park 4-5 (Summer 1969).
"& Hoc Genus Omne" and "Ideal Weapons for Suicide Pacts," Plant time bulletins by Erasmus "Willbeen" Darwin, aka J.H. Prynne, Bean News (1972).
"Veronica Forrest-Thomson: A Personal Memoir." On the Periphery (Street Editions, 1976); Rpt. Jacket 20 (Dec. 2002).
"Reader's Lockjaw." Perfect Bound 5 (1978); Rpt. Jacket 20 (Dec. 2002). 
"English Poetry and Emphatical Language." Proceedings of the British Academy 74 (1988).
"Letter to Steve McCaffery," dated 1989 [on Language Poetry]. The Gig 7 (Nov. 2000).
"Afterword" to Original: Chinese Language-Poetry Group. Parataxis Press, 1995; Rpt. Jacket 20 (Dec. 2002).
To Pollen. Barque Press, 2006.
"Tintern Abbey, Once Again," by J. H. Prynne. Glossator 1 (2009).
"Difficulties in the Translation of 'Difficult' Poems" by J.H. Prynne. Cambridge Literary Review 1/3 (2010).
"Poetic Thought." Textual Practice 24/4 (2010).
"Introduction to Prynne's Poems in Chinese," with Keston Sutherland. The Cambridge Quarterly 41/1 (2012).
"The Night Vigil of Shen Zhou." Glossator 3 (2020).

About Prynne
The Bibliography of J.H. Prynne, ed. Michael Tencer.
The J.H. Prynne Papers, Cambridge University Library Special Collections.
Finding aid for The English Intelligencer Archive at Fales Library and Special Collections, New York University.
Festschrift For J.H. Prynne, Quid 17 (2006)
On the Poems of J.H. Prynne. Ed. Ryan Dobran. Glossator 2 (2010). Complete volume dedicated to Prynne.
'Rich in Vitamin C', poem by J.H.Prynne, with commentary by John Kinsella. Jacket # 6 (January 1999).
"An introduction to the poetry of J.H.Prynne" by Rod Mengham and John Kinsella. Jacket # 7 (April 1999)
"Going Electric" by Patrick McGuinness. London Review of Books (7 Sept. 2000).
A review of The Collected Poems by Forrest Gander in The Chicago Review (2007).
"J.H. Prynne and the Late-Modern Epic" by Matt Hall. Cordite Poetry Review (December 2009)
"Prints in the New Snow: Notes on ‘Es Lebe der König’, J.H. Prynne’s Elegy to Paul Celan" by Matt Hall. Cordite Poetry Review (2013).
"The Huntsman of the Rubáiyat: J H Prynne and Peter Henry Lepus Go to Abu Ghraib" by Simon Eales. Cordite Poetry Review (February 2016).
"By Law in Sound: J.H. Prynne's Recent Poetry" by Luke Roberts, Chicago Review (2020).
"Bands Around the Throat, J.H. Prynne, Racial Capitalism" by M.A. King. Jacket 2 (2021).

1936 births
Living people
Alumni of Jesus College, Cambridge
Fellows of Gonville and Caius College, Cambridge
British poets
British Poetry Revival
British male poets
21st-century British male writers